Roberto Pavoni (born 22 March 1991) is an English former competitive swimmer who represented Great Britain in various international championships. At the 2012 Summer Olympics in London, he finished 13th overall in the heats in the Men's 400 metre individual medley and failed to reach the final.  He also competed in the 200m butterfly, again failing to reach the final.

He competed for England at the 2014 Commonwealth Games, reaching the final of the men's 200 m butterfly, men's 200 m individual medley, men's 400 m individual medley, and he was also part of the English 4 x 200 m freestyle relay team.  He retired from competitive swimming in 2017.

Pavoni attended St. Helen's Catholic Primary School, in Brentwood, Essex, and learnt to swim in the school's pool and Brentwood swimming club at Brentwood Center.

References

British male swimmers
Living people
Olympic swimmers of Great Britain
Swimmers at the 2012 Summer Olympics
English people of Italian descent
Male medley swimmers
1991 births
People from Harold Wood
Swimmers at the 2014 Commonwealth Games
Commonwealth Games competitors for England
Male butterfly swimmers